Luteoforol is a chemical compound belonging to the flavan-4-ol class of flavonoids.

Luteoforol is induced in pome fruits by prohexadione-calcium.

References

Flavan-4-ols
Catechols
Resorcinols